Railway companies in Europe assign their trains to different categories or train types depending on their role. Passenger trains may be broadly split into long-distance and local trains; the latter having average journey times of under an hour and a range of less than 50 kilometres. Goods trains have their own train types. The names of these train types have changed continually over the course of time.

A train type is not essentially a trademark name. However, there are trademark names that are also used as train types (e.g. CityNightLine, Cisalpino, VogtlandExpress).

European long-distance/high-speed rail brands

Austria

Germany

Switzerland

Private operators (Austria, Germany and Switzerland)

Belgium (NMBS/SNCB)
 InterCity (IC)
 A train connecting Belgium's major cities. These trains stop at the most important stations only, sometimes crossing national borders as well.
 Rush-hour train (P) 
 Additional scheduled train service that is limited to times at which the demand for a certain route is at its highest. The number of stops varies between trains.
 Local train (L)
 Local trains usually connect larger cities, but will stop at (nearly) every station along the way. Similar to German Regionalbahn
 S-trains (S)
 Suburban train connecting towns and cities around Belgium's major cities of Antwerp, Brussels, Charleroi, Ghent and Liege. Stops at (nearly) every station. Each line will have a number (S1 - S20 + S81 for Brussels, S1 + S32 - S34 for Antwerp, S41 - S44 for Liege, S51 - S53 for Ghent and S61 - S64 for Charleroi)
 Tourist train (ICT)
 Additional scheduled train service that is limited to times at which the demand for a certain touristic destination is at its highest. The number of stops varies between trains.
 Extra train
 Additional train service, used in case of exceptionally good weather to accommodate more passengers on routes to the coast or in case of special events such as concerts.
 Eurocity (EC)
 International train meeting certain quality criteria.
 International train (INT)
 Regular international train.
 Thalys (THA)
 High-speed trains to Germany, France and The Netherlands. (operated by SNCF, DB, NS and SNCB/NMBS)
 TGV
 High-speed trains to France. (Operated by SNCF)
 ICE
 High-speed trains to Germany. (Operated by DB)
 Eurostar (EST)
 High-speed trains to France and the UK. (operated by SNCF, SNCB/NMBS and Eurostar UK Ltd.)

Croatia 
There are several different ranks of passenger trains operating inside Croatia by „HŽ Putnički Prijevoz“ (Croatian Railways' sub-division responsible for passenger transport), as follows.

Inter-City trains – Croatian: Inter-City vlakovi – Inter-City trains represent the fairly limited amount of trains in Croatia. They operate on long routes and usually serve only the largest stations along the way.

Inter-City Titling trains – Croatian: Inter City Nagibni vlakovi (ICN) – ICN services are connecting Zagreb with Split using tilting trains. Thanks to their tilting mechanism they can run faster than conventional trains and represent only daytime connections between Zagreb and Split, also serving decent amount of larger stations along their route. Contrary to regular overnight fast trains between Zagreb and Split with scheduled travelling time of circa 8 hours in total, tilting trains on the Zagreb–Split route (lines M202 and M604) offer passengers a faster journey with a riding time of about 6 hours.

Fast trains – Croatian: Brzi vlakovi - Fast trains operate on medium to long distances, serving only stations in larger settlements along the track. Their purpose is very similar to Inter City trains.

Semi-fast trains – Croatian: Ubrzani vlakovi - Semi-fast trains operate on medium to long distances and their purpose is to serve destinations which have justified number of passengers, therefore skipping certain smaller stations which have not.

Regional and local trains – Croatian: Putnički vlakovi (lit. "passenger trains") – Regional and local trains cover short, medium and long distances and generally serve all stations along their route, representing the largest part of passenger trains on the nationwide level. They are mainly used by local residents traveling between smaller settlements and larger centres/railway hubs or by those who want to continue their journey further using mostly well-adjusted transfers - in both cases for daily migrations (school, work, hospital, shopping, etc.) or other reasons. These trains usually have daily frequencies that meet the needs of the local population.

Suburban trains – Croatian: Prigradski vlakovi - Suburban trains operate exclusively on the Zagreb Commuter Rail corridor and have the most frequent daily schedules above all types of train lines in Croatia. They are run by light motor sets that can be started and stopped quickly, and like the most of regional/local trains, they serve every station along their way. On the train lines operating within suburban areas of other larger towns, certain number of regional/local trains play the role of suburban trains.

Since large number of fast, semi fast, regional and local trains have commuter-oriented schedules, they often offer passengers daily migration to the large city areas from more distant towns and settlements – between 50 and 100 km (31 and 62 mi) – and vice versa. This can, for example, refer to the railway connection of the Central Croatia's wider region with Zagreb metropolitan area.

Categories of the trains which connect Croatia to other European countires include "fast trains", EuroCity, EuroNight and Nightjet.

Czech Republic (České dráhy)
 SuperCity (SC)
 highest-standard trains requiring reservation, made of modern tilting-train units operating on national and international routes. There is currently (February 2020) only one line: Františkovy lázně - Cheb - Mariánské lázně - Planá u Mariánských lázní - Stříbro - Plzeň hl.n. - Praha hl.n. - Pardubice hl.n. - Olomouc hl.n. - Ostrava-Svinov - Ostrava hl.n.- Bohumín - Český Těšín - Žilina - Ružomberok - Liptovský Mikuláš - Štrba - Poprad-Tatry - Kysak - Košice
 Railjet (rj) 
 highest-standard trains, operating on international routes from 2014 (Berlin - Praha – Brno – Wien – Graz).
 EuroCity (EC)
 higher-standard international trains, consisting of new or modernised cars of several rail companies and stopping at selected stations only.
 EuroNight (EN)
 international sleeper trains.
 InterCity (IC)
 the highest category of national trains, with carriages and stopping frequencies comparable to the EC trains. Currently, the IC category is used by the private railway company RegioJet as well as České dráhy.
 Express (Ex)
 faster trains linking regions, mostly faster and more comfortable than the R trains.
 Rychlík (R)
 the lowest category of longer-distance train. Operates on R lines. They are mainly used for getting between districts of a region.
 Spěšný vlak (Sp)
 local trains stopping on selected stations only. Operates on S lines.
 Osobní vlak (Os)
 local trains stopping at every station. Operates on S lines. It is often centered around a larger city (often capital of a region).

Denmark (DSB and others)

DSB (Danish State Railways)

Arriva

Nordjyske Jernbaner (North Jutland Railways)

Local trains

Light rail

Metro

Finland (VR)

NOTE: Long distance trains are identified (in passenger information systems) by train number prefixed with the train type abbreviation (e.g. "IC 90"). However, the Helsinki region commuter trains are identified by their "route letters" only (e.g. "K") and usually do not show their train number to passengers at all.

France (SNCF)
SNCF use a different system of trains categories, based on politics wishes and commercial trademarks. Categories do not necessarily match with distance.

 TGV (Train à Grande Vitesse)
 National or international services by high speed trains with supplementary fare, totally or partially on high-speed lines. Similar to Germany's ICE.

 Intercité de Nuit
 Night service

 Intercités
 National services, ever on main lines and/or secondary lines without supplementary fare. Similar to the InterRegio or the Intercity (Paris – Caen – Cherbourg and Paris – Rouen – Le Havre). Have been used to be called Train Inter Regional, but is obsolete.

 TER (Train Express Régional)
 These trains are subsidized by regions and do not designate a precise category, a TER route can be anything from 10 miles to more than 250 miles long. Some TER routes are longer than TGV ones.
 Regional or national services, on main lines or secondary lines without supplementary fare. Used to be similar to the S-Bahn (many stops from a major city on a short distance, urban or suburban service), the Regional or RegioExpress, but can be also similar to the InterRegio-Express or Intercity (Interloire Nantes – Orléans) and the InterRegio (Orléans – Lyon, Toulouse – Clermont-Ferrand).
 Some special regional trains called TERGV (TER and TGV). The TERGV consists in TGV trains subsidized for regional service, though with a supplementary fare compared to the same trip using standard TER service. These trains use the high speed lines (LGV) to quickly link cities such as Dunkirk, Calais, and Boulogne-sur-Mer to Lille in an hour. Similar services in Europe include Southeastern's Highspeed service.
 There are also TER200, iC TER and Interloire

thello
These trains are not operated by the SNCF but by thello, a newly created society owned by Transdev and the FS, between France and Italy, after breaking an alliance between the SNCF and the FS.

Hungary (MÁV, GYSEV)
Long distance trains

 Eurocity (often Railjet)
 international trains

 Intercity
 trains mainly in national services on important long-distance routes often with air conditioning, restaurant car and always seat reservation
 Expressz
 express train with compulsory seat reservation (only summertime)
 Gyorsvonat
 rapid trains on long-distance routes with standard rolling stock
 Sebesvonat
 Eilzug equivalent
 Interrégió
This trains make connections with Intercity trains from smaller towns. Air conditioned, allowed to travel with bike or wheelchair.

Local trains

 Zónázó
 RegionalBahn or "Regional Express" equivalent
 Személyvonat
 Regionalzug equivalent
 EURegio
 state-subsidiarised international stopping trains near the Austrian border, connects Győr to Vienna and Wiener Neustadt to Graz via Sopron, Szombathely and Jennersdorf
 Regional-Express
 ÖBB REX trains serve the Vienna-Ebenfurth-Sopron-Deutschkreutz line

Italy (Trenitalia and others)
Categories without * are operated by Trenitalia.

International quality services
These trains are long distance international services generally with mandatory reservation. They are operated by different companies such as Thello (Italy-Paris).

 EuroCity
 EuroNight (night services)
 TGV, operated by SVI (Società Viaggiatori Italia, a company of SNCF)

High-speed trains 
 Frecciarossa
 Frecciargento
 .italo (* NTV)

Long-distance services
 Frecciabianca: trains running once every hour or two hours on the most important long-distance routes (replaced most Intercity on main lines as of 13 December 2008)
 InterCity
 InterCity Notte (night services)

Regional and local trains
These categories are also used by regional railways (generally isolated from the national railway network). These trains are financed by administrative regions:

 Regionale Veloce "RV" (Regio Express "RE" for the Merano-Malles railway managed by SAD and for Trenord): local or interregional trains only stopping in few selected stations
 Regionale "R": basic local train, equates to German Regionalbahn
 Suburbano "S": suburban commuter services, for the Milan suburban railway service (* Trenord)
 Metropolitano: for Naples suburban service's line 2 and trains running from Cagliari to Decimomannu in Sardinia

Circumvesuviana (Naples area)
Circumvesuviana (a group of narrow-gauge railways connecting towns to the south-east of Naples) has a special classification: accelerato, diretto and direttissimo, which was the former classification used by FS. Diretto is also used by Società Subalpina Imprese Ferroviarie for the cross-border Domodossola–Locarno railway.

Ireland (Iarnród Éireann and NI Railways)
Four different train categories are operated in Ireland by NI Railways and Iarnród Éireann.
D.A.R.T, Rapid Transit train network in Dublin.
Commuter, Suburban services operated around major cities.
Intercity, Long Distance or Local Services operated between cities.
Enterprise, Long Distance service operated Jointly by NI Railways and Iarnród Éireann out of Dublins Connolly Rail Station to Belfast Lanyon Place railway station.

Luxembourg
Because of its small size and its location, Luxembourg has more international trains than national ones.

International trains
 EuroCity (EC)
International trains connecting Belgium and Switzerland through Luxembourg and France (Brussels-South – Basel/Chur/Zurich).
 InterCity (IC)
Long-distance trains from either Belgium (InterCity J: Brussels-South – Luxembourg) and Germany (Cologne – Luxembourg).
 InterRegio (IR)
Long-distance trains from Belgium (InterRegio m: Luxembourg – Liège/Lier)
 TGV
High-speed train from France (Paris – Luxembourg)
 Intercités de Nuit
Night service from France (Nice – Luxembourg) and Spain (Port-Bou – Luxembourg)
 TER Lorraine
Regional train from Lorraine, France (Longuyon – Luxembourg ; Longwy – Esch-sur-Alzette – Thionville ; Nancy – Luxembourg, French extension to Épinal and Remiremont)
 Regional-Express (RE)
Regional train from Rhineland-Palatinate, Germany (Trier – Luxembourg, German extension to Wittlich and Cochern)
 Piekuurtrein/rush-hour train (P)
Regional trains from Belgium, circulating in rush-hour only (Virton – Rodange, Arlon – Rodange)
 Lokale trein/local train (L)
Regional trains from Belgium (Arlon – Rodange – Virton/Gedinne/Libramont)

National trains
 InterRegio (IR)
Long-distance train between Luxembourg and either Diekirch or Troisvierges (extension from Troisvierges with the Belgian IR m)
 Regionalexpress (RE)
Regional trains, including extensions to border stations in France (Volmerange-les-Mines, Audun-le-Tiche, Longwy) and in Belgium (Athus)

Luxembourgish? Foreign?
Some trains are considered both Luxembourgish (by the CFL, according to their map) and from the border country the train is from or crossing (like L and P trains from Belgium, TER from France, RE from Germany), no matter if these trains are really from Luxembourg or not, making these trains more difficult to classify. These difficulties are due to the assimilation of each train as Regionalexpress or InterRegio in Luxembourg (similar name in Germany and Belgium, specific name in France).

Netherlands (NS and others)
Also see Rail transport in the Netherlands
 Thalys
 High speed train to Belgium and France
 ICE International
 High speed train to Germany and Switzerland
 Eurostar
 High speed train to Belgium, France and the United Kingdom
 Intercity Direct
 Semi high speed trains from Amsterdam to Schiphol Airport, Rotterdam, Breda, Antwerp and Brussels
 InterCity
 Brand used by NS for trains linking cities across the country, not calling at every station. Trains to Berlin are also branded Intercity. Typically calling at 25–50% of the intermediate stations they pass, Intercities are comparable to the InterRegio used in many European countries. Some call at every station for a part of their run near their terminus ("zone train").
 Sneltrein
 Brand used by other operators on the regional railways for trains comparable to the Intercity, but typically running shorter distances.
 Sprinter
 NS brand, since 2018 also used by other operators, for local trains calling at (almost) every station on the mainline railway stations
 Stoptrein
 Brand used by other operators for local trains calling at (almost) every station on all stations that are not located on the regional railways.

Poland (PKP and others)
 EuroNight (EN)
 high quality night train; operated by PKP Intercity
 EuroCity (EC)
 international luxury trains on the most important long-distance routes, must be reserved on domestic routes, up to 160 km/h; operated by PKP Intercity
Express Intercity Premium (EIP)
 high speed rail, highest-standard trains requiring reservation, made of modern tilting-train units operating on national routes, operated by PKP Intercity using units ED250 Pendolino
 Express InterCity (EIC)
 luxury trains in national services on the most important long-distance routes, must be reserved, up to 160 km/h; operated by PKP Intercity;
InterCity (IC)
 Trains of new EMUs and refurbished coaches, more comfortable than TLK, in national services on the most important long-distance routes, up to 160 km/h; operated by PKP Intercity;
 Twoje Linie Kolejowe (TLK)
 Fast trains on inter-regional routes; few up to 160 km/h operated by PKP Intercity. Pricing is same as IC.
InterRegio (IR)
 Few trains between Warsaw and Łódź; cheaper than "TLK", but usually with lower standard, 2nd class only; operated by Polregio. Rolling stock is refurbished EMUs of late 1960s design, speed up to 120 km/h.
 Regio (R)
 local passenger train, 2nd class only; Formerly called "osobowy" and often confused; operated by Polregio.
 Osobowy (os.)
 local passenger train, 2nd class only; operated by Arriva RP (consortium of Arriva and DB Cargo Polska), Koleje Dolnośląskie, Koleje Małopolskie, Koleje Śląskie, Koleje Wielkopolskie, Łódzka Kolej Aglomeracyjna, Warszawska Kolej Dojazdowa and Koleje Mazowieckie.
 Szybka Kolej Miejska (Warsaw)
 Szybka Kolej Miejska (Tricity)
 S-Bahn in Tricity (operated by PKP SKM) and Warsaw (operated by SKM Warszawa)

Portugal

CP - Comboios de Portugal (State Owned Operator)

Long Distance Services 

 Alfa Pendular (AP): Fast tilting trains used on the main North/South lines, only stopping at major intermediate cities with a top speed of 220 km/h. Surcharge payable;
 InterCidades (IC): InterCity trains used on main lines, stopping only at main towns with a top speed of 200 km/h. Surcharge payable;
 Internacional (IN): International night trains Sud-Express (Lisbon-Hendaye) and Lusitânia (Lisbon-Madrid) and day train Celta (Porto-Vigo).

Medium Distance Services 

 InterRegional (IR): Semi-fast trains used on main lines, stopping at all main towns and some smaller towns with speeds up to 160 km/h;
 Regional (R): Stopping trains used on main lines, stopping at all stations (with some exceptions) with speeds up to 140 km/h.

Short Distance Services 

 Urbanos (U): Commuter trains used in or around the major cities with speeds up to 140 Km/h.

Leisure Services 

 Comboio Histórico do Douro: Douro Valley Line Historic Train (Summer weekends only);
 Comboio Histórico do Vouga: Vouga Line Historic Train (Weekends around some holidays).

Fertagus (Private Operator) 

 Urbanos (U): Commuter trains in the Greater Lisbon Area with speeds up to 140 Km/h. Operations limited to the route between Roma-Areeiro - Setúbal.

Romania (Caile Ferate Romane – CFR)

Current
 Regio (R)
 Local trains, stopping every station, speeds up to 120 km/h.
 Regio Express (RE) – 1st and 2nd class cars
 Regio – mainly 2nd class cars
 Regio Urban/Suburban (RU/RS) – commuter trains, mainly 2nd class cars
 InterRegio (IR)
 Semi-fast trains, usually for long distances, speeds up to 160 km/h, stopping at the main stations and some smaller towns.
 InterRegio – longer distance trains than Regio, only stop in stations where connections to other destinations are available
 InterRegio Night (IRN)- sleeping services assured, frequent stops, may include cars from foreign operators and/or autoracks

Former
 Personal (P)
 Local trains, stopping every station, speeds up to 120 km/h.
 Accelerat (A)
 Semi-fast trains, usually for long distances, speeds up to 140 km/h, stopping at the main stations and some smaller towns.
 Rapid (R)
 Fast trains, speeds up to 160 km/h, stopping on major cities.
 Euronight (EN)
 Night trains, fewer stops only on major cities, speeds up to 160 km/h.
 InterCity (IC)
 Fast trains, speeds up to 160 km/h, stopping on major cities.
 InterCity/EuroCity (IC/EC) – national and international services, stopping in important stations only
 EuroNight (EN) –  night services of the IC/EC
 InterCity Night (ICN) – sleeping services assured, important stops only, may include cars from foreign operators and/or autoracks

Russia (RZD)
Train category is defined by its number's digits.

 1 to 150 – Skory (Fast)
 All-year long-distance fast trains, mostly overnight. Speeds up to 160 km/h, but usually the average speed is not more than 70 km/h.
 151 to 298 – Skory Sezonny (Fast seasonal)
 Seasonal fast trains, mostly similar to Skory.
 301 to 450 – Passazhirsky Dalny (Long-distance passenger)
 Long-distance stopping trains.
 451 to 498 – Passazhirsky Dalny Sezonny (Long-distance passenger seasonal)
 Seasonal Passazhirsky Dalny services.
 501 to 598 – Passazhirsky Dalny Razovy (Long-distance passenger one-time)
 Additional or organized children groups carrying Passazhirsky Dalny services.
 601 to 698 – Passazhirsky Mestny (Local (medium-distance) passenger)
 Stopping trains travelling distances more than 150 km, but less than 700 km.
 701 to 750 – Skorostnoy (Speedy – like InterCity in Germany)
 Intercity trains.
 751 to 788 – Vysokoskorostnoy (High-speed)
 High-speed or Intercity-Express trains (Sapsans, (by Karelian Trains) Allegros).
 801 to 898 – Obsluzhivaemyj dizel'- ili elektropoezdom (Served by DMU or EMU)
 Mainline passenger trains featuring DMU / (out of the EMU-served Skorostnoy's and (all served by EMUs) Vysokoskorostnoy's) EMU rolling stock. Mostly fast versions of Passazhirsky Mestny.
 6001 to 6998 – Prigorodny (Suburban)
 Suburban trains (travelling distance up to 150 km, (almost) all-stops services).
 7001 to 7598 – Skory Prigorodny ili Gorodskoy (Semi-fast suburban or urban)
 Semi-fast suburban trains and urban trains.

Slovakia (ZSSK)
 SuperCity – pendolino (SC)
 highest-standard trains requiring reservation, operated by modern ČD Class 680 „Pendolino“ tilting-train units of České dráhy (ČD) operating on both national and international routes in cooperation with ČD
 LEO Express (LE)
 private trains, similar to the IC category
 EuroCity (EC)
 high quality, usually long-haul international services between Hungary, Slovakia, Czech Republic and Germany. Surcharge payable when travelling with domestic ticket
 InterCity (IC)
 high quality trains providing only air-conditioned carriages, all trains are between Bratislava and Košice
 EuroNight (EN)
 high quality night train between Košice and Prague and between Budapest and Berlin 
 Express (Ex)
 this category is used for trains which operate as EuroCity in other countries, but failed to qualify for EuroCity in Slovakia due to high quality standards given by ZSSK. However, there are also domestic express service from Banská Bystrica to Bratislava (Ex 530/531) and from Košice to Bratislava (Ex 1502, runs on Sundays)
 Rýchlik (R)
 "fast train" – trains for longer routes, usually stops at all towns en route, but not at villages. However, there are also night trains between Humenné and Prague and from Košice to Cheb
 Regional Express (REX)
 local semi-fast train stopping at few stations, modern version of Zrýchlený vlak 
this category is also used by RegioJet between Komárno and Bratislava
 Zrýchlený vlak (Zr)
 semi-fast train, today is mostly used Regional Express version; Zrýchlený vlak run from Zvolen to Žilina
 Osobný vlak (Os)
 stopping train, serving all stations
this category is also used by RegioJet between Komárno and Bratislava

Slovenia (Slovenske železnice [SŽ])
 InterCity Slovenija (ICS)
 modern air-conditioned trains whose tilting technology allows for greater speed and comfort. They enable easier travel for passengers in wheelchairs, as well as offering a range of additional services. A buffet car is available to passengers; for those who travel 1st class, this service is free. 1st class passengers also benefit from access to electrical plug sockets. At some stations free parking is available. ICS trains operate on the Ljubljana-Maribor-Ljubljana route. In the summer season and on Saturdays, Sundays and public holidays, ICS trains also operate along the Maribor-Ljubljana-Koper route and back. Seats must be reserved on all routes and this is included in the rail fare.
 InterCity (IC)
 are high quality trains which operate on long-distance domestic and international routes and connect major cities, and commercial and tourist centres. They consist of comfortable carriages, and have shorter journey times with fewer stops. Most of them also offer catering services. IC services require an additional IC supplement.
 EuroCity (EC)
 are high quality international trains which operate along major international routes and connect important economic and tourist hubs in Slovenia and Europe. Journey times of EC trains are shorter and have fewer stops. Most of them have air-conditioned carriages and offer catering services. An additional supplement is required for travel on EC trains.
 EuroNight (EN)
 are high quality international night trains which include sleepers and couchettes. A supplement is required for a bed or berth. For travel on a domestic EN, as with IC trains, it is necessary to pay a supplement for a seat in a standard carriage. On certain EN trains which operate across Europe, standard international prices apply together with a reservation fee.
 Local Train (LP)
 connects Slovenian towns on shorter and longer routes. These are intended primarily for daily journeys to and from work or to school. Seat reservations and supplements are not required to travel on these trains.

Spain (Renfe)
 AVE
 High speed trains, speeds up to 310 km/h
 Routes:
Madrid–Ciudad Real–Puertollano–Córdoba–Sevilla
Madrid–Ciudad Real–Puertollano–Córdoba–Puente Genil-Herrera–Antequera–Málaga
Madrid–Ciudad Real–Puertollano–Córdoba–Puente Genil-Herrera–Antequera–Loja–Granada
Madrid–Guadalajara–Calatayud–Zaragoza–Huesca
Madrid–Guadalajara–Calatayud–Zaragoza–Lleida–Tarragona–Barcelona
Madrid–Guadalajara–Calatayud–Zaragoza–Lleida–Tarragona–Barcelona–Girona–Figueres
Madrid–Valladolid–Burgos.
Madrid–Segovia–Valladolid–León
Madrid–Zamora–Ourense
Madrid–Cuenca–Requena-Utiel–Valencia
Madrid–Cuenca–Valencia–Castellón
Madrid–Cuenca–Albacete–Villena–Alicante
Madrid–Cuenca–Albacete–Elche–Orihuela–Murcia
Valencia–Madrid–Burgos
Sevilla–Córdoba–Puertollano–Ciudad Real–Zaragoza–Lleida–Tarragona–Barcelona
Sevilla–Córdoba–Puertollano–Ciudad Real–Cuenca–Valencia
Málaga–Antequera–Puente Genil-Herrera–Córdoba–Puertollano–Ciudad Real–Zaragoza–Lleida–Tarragona–Barcelona
Barcelona–Tarragona–Lleida–Zaragoza–Córdoba–Puente Genil-Herrera–Antequera–Granada
Alicante–Albacete–Cuenca–Madrid–Zamora–Ourense
 Alvia
 High speed trains capable of operating in both high-speed and conventional lines, speeds up to 250 km/h
 Routes:
Madrid–Valladolid–Palencia–León–Oviedo–Gijón
Madrid–Valladolid–Palencia–Aguilar de Campoo–Reinosa–Torrelavega–Santander
Madrid–Segovia–Valladolid–Burgos–Miranda de Ebro–Bilbao
Madrid–Segovia–Valladolid–Burgos–Miranda de Ebro–Vitoria–Zumarraga–Tolosa–San Sebastián–Irun
Madrid–Segovia–Medina del Campo–Salamanca
Madrid–Segovia–Medina del Campo–Zamora–Sanabria–A Gudiña–Ourense–Santiago de Compostela–A Coruña– Betanzos–Pontedeume–Ferrol
Madrid–Segovia–Medina del Campo–Zamora–Sanabria–A Gudiña–Ourense–Pontevedra–Vigo
Madrid–Segovia–Medina del Campo–Zamora–Sanabria–A Gudiña-Ourense–Monforte De Lemos–Sarria–Lugo
Madrid–Zamora–Ourense–Santiago de Compostela–A Coruña
Madrid–Zamora–Sanabria–A Gudiña–Ourense–Santiago de Compostela
Madrid–Zamora–Sanabria–A Gudiña–Ourense–Santiago de Compostela–Vilagarcía de Arousa–Pontevedra
Madrid–Guadalajara–Calatayud–Tudela–Tafalla–Pamplona
Madrid–Guadalajara–Calatayud–Tudela–Calahorra–Logroño
Madrid–Cordoba–La Palma del Condado–Huelva
Madrid–Ciudad Real–Puertollano–Córdoba–Sevilla–Jerez de la Frontera–Cádiz
Madrid–Albacete–Hellin–Cieza–Murcia–Balsicas-mar Menor–Torre-Pacheco–Cartagena
Barcelona–Tarragona–Lleida–Zaragoza–Tudela–Castejon–Calahorra–Logroño–Haro–Miranda de Ebro–Bilbao
Barcelona–Tarragona–Lleida–Zaragoza–Tudela–Castejon–Tafalla–Pamplona–Altsasu–Zumarraga–San Sebastián
Barcelona–Tarragona–Lleida–Zaragoza–Tudela–Castejon–Tafalla–Pamplona–Vitoria–Miranda de Ebro–Burgos–Valladolid–Medina del Campo–Salamanca
Barcelona–Tarragona–Lleida–Zaragoza–Tudela–Castejon–Tafalla–Pamplona–Vitoria–Miranda de Ebro–Burgos–Palencia–Sahagun–León–Astorga–Bembibre–Ponferrada–O Barco de Valdeorras–A Rúa–San Clodio-Quiroga–Monforte de Lemos–Ourense–Santiago de Compostela–A Coruña
Barcelona–Lleida–Zaragoza–Pamplona–Vitoria–Burgos–León–Ponferrada–Ourense–Vigo
Alicante–Villena–Albacete–Cuenca–Madrid–Segovia–Valladolid–Palencia–Torrelavega–Santander
Gijón–Oviedo–Mieres Del Camín–La Pola de Gordón–León–Palencia–Valladolid–Segovia–Madrid–Cuenca–Requena Utiel–Valencia–Sagunto–Castellón
Gijón–Oviedo–Mieres Del Camín–La Pola de Gordón–León–Palencia–Valladolid–Segovia–Madrid–Cuenca–Valencia–Sagunto–Castellón–Benicàssim–Oropesa del Mar–Benicarló–Vinaros
 Avant, Media Distancia
 High speed trains for medium distances (also called Lanzadera AVE). Speeds up to 250 km/h
 Routes:
Madrid–Toledo
Madrid Pta. Atocha–Ciudad Real–Puertollano
Madrid Chamartín–Segovia–Valladolid
Sevilla–Córdoba–Puente Genil–Antequera–Málaga
Barcelona–Tarragona–Lleida
Barcelona–Girona–Figueres
Barcelona–Camp de Tarragona–Cambrils–L'Hospitalet de l'Infant–Tortosa.
Calatayud–Zaragoza
A Coruña–Santiago de Compostela-Ourense
Valencia–Requena Utiel
 Euromed
 High speed trains operate in the Mediterranean coast, speeds up to 220 km/h
 Routes:
Barcelona-Valencia-Alicante
 Altaria
 Trains which use different locomotives in high-speed and conventional lines, speeds up to 200 km/h
 Routes:
Madrid-Ronda-Algeciras
Madrid-Antequera-Granada
Madrid-Murcia-Cartagena (only conventional lines)
 Talgo
 Tilting trains in high-speed and conventional lines, link Madrid with other capital cities, speeds up to 150 km/h
 Routes:
Madrid-Almería
Murcia- Barcelona
 Arco
 Conventional trains, link Barcelona with other capital cities
 Routes:
Barcelona-Mérida-Badajoz
Barcelona-Sevilla
Barcelona-Málaga
Barcelona-Granada
Barcelona-Almería
Barcelona-Murcia, nowadays classified as a Talgo
 Trenhotel
 Night services
 Routes:
Madrid-Lisbon
Barcelona-Paris
Barcelona-Zürich
Barcelona-Milan C.le
Lisbon-Irun
Madrid- Santiago-  A Coruña
Madrid – Vigo 
Barcelona-Vigo
Barcelona-Gijón

 Middle distance services, speeds up to 160 km/h
 Routes: all over continental Spain
 Cercanías
 Short distance services in metropolitan areas, speeds up to 120 km/h
 Areas (clockwise): Madrid, Zaragoza, Barcelona, Valencia, Murcia/Alicante, Málaga, Cádiz, Sevilla, Oviedo/Gijón, Santander, Bilbao, San Sebastián Cercanías de Zaragoza

Sweden
SJ
Fast trains
Inter-city
Regional
Night trains
County operated
Regional trains, usually with various brand names, such as Öresundståg, Västtågen, Norrtåg, Krösatåg etc
Local trains, usually called pendeltåg
Other
Arlanda Express
Blå Tåget
FlixTrain
MTRX
Saga Rail
Snälltåget
Tågab

Ukraine (Ukrzaliznycya)

Day-time trains:
 Eurocity (ЄС)
 International long-distance services; 90–200 km/h; 1st and 2nd class only.
 Intercity + (ІС+)
 National long-distance services; 90–200 km/h; 1st and 2nd class only.
 Intercity (IC)
 National long-distance services; 70–160 km/h; 1st, 2nd and 3rd class.
 Regional Express (РЕ)
 Regional services; 70–140 km/h; 1st, 2nd and 3rd class.
 Regional Train (Р)
 Regional services; up to 120 km/h; 2nd and 3rd class only.
 Suburban Train (РП)
 Suburban train services; 3rd class only.
 City Train (М)
 Urban train services; 3rd class only.

Overnight trains:
 Euro Night (EN)
 International night train services; 90–200 km/h; Lux, SV and Kupe classes.
 Night Express (НЕ)
 International and national night train services; 70–160 km/h; Lux, SV, Kupe and Platzkart classes.
 Night Fast Train (НШ)
 National night train services; 50–140 km/h; SV, Kupe and Platzkart classes.
 Night Passenger Train (НП)
 National night train services; up to 140 km/h; Kupe and Platzkart classes.

United Kingdom

The United Kingdom's railway network is unusual in not publicly numbering or classifying its trains, except by the brand of the operating company. This may approach a classification system on lines where the express and local services are operated by different companies:
 Great Eastern Main Line: all services are operated by Greater Anglia, except for urban local services between London Liverpool Street and Shenfield. These services form the eastern leg of the Elizabeth line, all legs of which are operated by MTR Elizabeth line.
 Lea Valley Lines: services on the main route, regardless of stopping pattern, are operated by Greater Anglia. The Southbury Loop and Chingford branch routes are operated by London Overground.
 East Coast Main Line:
 A variety of companies run intercity trains on the East Coast Main Line, of which the principal operator is London North Eastern Railway.
 Regional services are run as Govia Thameslink Railway as far as Peterborough, Northern between Darlington and Chathill, & Abellio ScotRail from Dunbar.
 London suburban services are operated by Govia Thameslink Railway.
 West Coast Main Line:
 Avanti West Coast is the dominant brand of intercity trains.
 Stopping & semi-fast services are run by West Midlands Trains & branded as London Northwestern Railway from London Euston as far as the junction for the Liverpool Lime Street branch, & by Northern between Wigan North Western & Preston.
 Suburban services in London are run by London Overground, while those in Lanarkshire are operated by Abellio ScotRail.
 Great Western Main Line: suburban services of London are operated by MTR Crossrail as the western leg of the Elizabeth line. All other trains, including Bristol's suburban network, are operated by Great Western Railway.
 Regional & regional express trains of Wales & suburban trains of Cardiff are operated by Transport for Wales Rail. The country's two intercity routes, through the Severn Tunnel and along the North Wales Coast Line are operated by Great Western Railway and Avanti West Coast respectively.
 Brighton Main Line: Govia Thameslink Railway runs airport express trains under a dedicated brand (Gatwick Express). Other trains are branded by destination: those going via London Blackfriars are branded as Thameslink, others as Southern
 In the North of England, local & suburban trains are almost exclusively run by Northern and regional express services by TransPennine Express.
 In Scotland, all trains not running to/from England are operated by Abellio ScotRail.
 Stagecoach Group, while operator of the Midland & South Western franchises, painted its trains in 3 liveries: suburban trains in a red-based livery, regional blue, & intercity white.

In scheduling, trains are classified as express, local, sleeper, international or metro trains. However, these are not shown in passenger-facing publications, and express trains can have stopping sections calling at consecutive minor stops, acting as a local service on the section. For example, all trains run on the Thameslink core between London St Pancras and London Blackfriars, no matter express or local, call at all intermediate stations between them, creating a frequent metro-like service as an alternative to London Underground for travelling in central London.

For most longer distance services (such as the inter-city trains operated by CrossCountry), advance tickets are sold and seat reservations can be made and, since the beginning of COVID-19 pandemic, some are even made compulsory. While on shorter services (e.g. South Western Railway Weymouth - London services), sometimes only counted-place reservations can be made but not for a specific seat for advance tickets, and on even shorter suburban services (e.g. South Western Railway Guildford - London stopping services), no reservation can be made at all and no advance tickets can be sold.

Bulgaria (Bulgarian state railways BDŽ) 
Train categories in Bulgaria use the simplified model of the previous century. At the beginning of rail transport in Bulgaria there were only three categories of passenger trains: "Бърз пътнически влак (БПВ)" - Barz patnicheski vlak (Fast passenger train), the equivalent of the current Fast train; "Обикновен пътнически влак (ОПВ)" - Obiknoven patnicheski vlak (Regular passenger train), the equivalent of the current Passenger train and "Смесен пътнически влак (СПВ)" - Smesen patnicheski vlak, the equivalent of Mixed train. Using this basis BDŽ now provides extended variety of these simple categories.

ЕВ – Експресен влак [Ekspresen vlak] – Express train
 EV – Trains for medium and long distances, which stop only at the most major stations (in big cities or for a train connection). They provide higher comfort in the carriages and usually have catering and/or restaurant car. All the express trains used to have names (e.g. "Plovdiv Express", "Yantra Express", "Chaika Express", "Express Slanchev Bryag", "Diana Express" etc.) and sometimes unique livery, different from the other trains. There were also first-class-only trains (Express 100/101 "Plovdiv"). Because of an introduced regulation the average speed of the express trains to be at least 100 km/h, all the express trains became BVZR trains. Tariff: same as BVZR.
Reservation: obligatory.  Coaches: 1st class, 2nd class, restaurant car (or catering), sometimes luggage and/or mail car. Four of the express trains ("Shipka" and "Sinite kamani") used DMUs.
Currently not in service.
УБВ – Ускорен бърз влак [Uskoren barz vlak] – literally "Accelerated fast train"
 UBV – Trains for long distances, which stop only at one or two major stations in-between. They ran seasonally only between the capital and the seaside on Fridays and Sundays. For a short period of time this category was used as a synonym of BVZR trains. Tariff: same as BVZR.
Reservation: obligatory.  Coaches: 1st class, 2nd class, bistro car.
Currently not in service.
 БВЗР – Бърз влак със задължителна резервация [Barz vlak sas zadalzhitelna rezervatsia] – Fast train with obligatory reservation (also seen as R-БВ or БВ-R)
 BVZR – Trains for medium and long distances, which stop only at major stations. Usually former Express trains. Their average speed is not more than 100 km/h. Some of these also have names, but with the word "express" removed.  Tariff: The tariff for BVZR is the most expensive in Bulgaria. The price for 100 km in 2nd class is 8,70 BGN (4,45 EUR) and 10,90 BGN (5,57 EUR) in 1st class. Reservation costs 0,50 BGN (0,26 EUR). Some trains could be more expensive on partisular dates.
Reservation: obligatory.  Coaches: 1st class, 2nd class; in the past: restaurant or buffet car (or catering), sometimes luggage and/or mail car.
 МБВ – Международен бърз влак [Mezhdunaroden barz vlak] – International fast train
 MBV – International trains have different terms of service. There are regular, seasonal and extra MBV trains as well as trains for only international journeys and ones that could be used as regular BV trains in the country.
Tariff: Internal: same as BV; international: according to the contracts with the other countries.
Reservation: Internal: optional; international: obligatory.  Coaches: international cars + cars for internal journeys (2nd class, sometimes 1st class, in the past: luggage and/or mail car). DMUs are also used between Bulgaria and Romania.
 БВ – Бърз влак [Barz vlak] – Fast train
 BV – Trains for medium and long distances, which stop only at major stations but more than express trains.
Tariff: According to the tariff for BV the price for 100 km in 2nd class is 5.90 BGN (3.02 EUR) and 7.40 BGN (3.78 EUR) in 1st class. Reservation costs 0.50 BGN (0.26 EUR). Some trains could be more expensive on partisular dates.
Reservation: optional.  Coaches: 1st class, 2nd class; sleepers and couchette cars during the night; in the past: sometimes restaurant or buffet car, luggage and/or mail car. Sometimes EMUs or DMUs are also used.
 ПВ – Пътнически влак [Patnicheski vlak] – Passenger train
 PV – Trains for distances, longer than 100 km, which stop at every station.
Tariff: According to the tariff for PV the price for 100 km in 2nd class is 5.20 BGN (2.66 EUR) and 6.50 BGN (3.32 EUR) in 1st class. Currently 1st class is not available on passenger trains. Some trains could be more expensive on partisular dates.
Reservation: not available.  Coaches: 2nd class; in the past: sometimes luggage and/or mail car; in case of first-class cars coupled, the taxes are the same as second-class ones. Frequently operated by EMUs or DMUs.
 КПВ – Крайградски пътнически влак [Kraigradski patnicheski vlak] – Local passenger train
 KPV – Trains for distances, shorter than 100 km, which stop at every station. Frequently operated by EMUs or DMUs. Tariff: same as PV.
Reservation: not available.  Coaches: 2nd class; in the past: sometimes luggage and/or mail car; in case of first-class cars coupled, the taxes are the same as second-class ones.
СВ – Смесен влак [Smesen vlak] – Mixed train
 SV – Trains for short and medium distances with both passenger and freight carriages. They stop at every station and usually it is for a long time, because of the cargo services. Tariff: same as PV.
Reservation: not available.  Coaches: same as PV + freight waggons.
Currently not in service.

Former Yugoslavia (Successor companies of the JŽ)
 Eurocity
 international high-class trains
 Intercity
 trains used on national and international services on important long-distance routes
 Intercity nagibni
 Croatian Railways tilting train
 Poslovni voz/vlak
 Intercity – similar to express trains, usually 1st class only
 Brzi voz/vlak
 Express trains on long-distance routes, national and international
 Zeleni vlak
 Former Slovenian express multiple-unit connexions, also cross-border
 Ubrzani vlak
 semi-fast (like German Eilzug)
 Putnički voz, Lokalni voz, Potniški vlak
 Regional train stopping at all station, usually multiple unit trains

See also
Sleeper trains in Europe

Footnotes and References

Passenger rail transport
Rail transport in Europe